Eileen Ivers (born July 13, 1965) is an American fiddler.

Ivers was born in New York City of Irish-born parents, grew up in the Bronx and attended St. Barnabas High School.  She spent summers in Ireland and took up the fiddle at the age of nine. Her teacher was the Irish fiddler Martin Mulvihill.  She toured with Mick Moloney's band The Green Fields of America, founded in 1977. She graduated magna cum laude from Iona College in New York and has done post-graduate work in mathematics.

History 
Ivers was a founding member of Cherish the Ladies. She recorded and toured with them for several years.

In 1995, she replaced the original fiddler in the Riverdance Irish dance troupe and toured with them.

Her original blue Barcus-Berry electric fiddle was eye-catching and inspired the name of her album Wild Blue. She later replaced it with a blue ZETA Strados acoustic-electric fiddle, which is a one-of-a-kind instrument with unique sound and ambience. It was custom-made for her by ZETA Music Systems (who will be producing an "Eileen Ivers Signature Series" Blue electric violin exactly like hers).

Ivers has recorded with Micheál Ó Súilleabháin, an Irish composer who uses folk, classical and jazz influences, on the television series River of Sound and on his album Becoming (1998).

She also recorded a traditional air for the soundtrack to the film Gangs of New York, entitled "Lament for Stalker Wallace". She appears on the soundtrack for the film Some Mother's Son.

Ivers was also an inaugural member of the Independent Music Awards' judging panel to support independent artists.

Discography

Studio albums

Compilation albums

Cherish the Ladies

As a session or guest musician
 Riverdance: Music from the Show (1995)
 Song of the Irish Whistle by Joanie Madden (1996)
 "The Celtic Album" by The Boston Pops Orchestra (1998)
 "The Fiddling Ladies" by The Chieftains on the album Tears of Stone (1999)
 "Becoming" by Micheál Ó Súilleabháin (1998)
 Celtic Solstice by Paul Winter (1999)
 Seed (2003) by Afro Celt Sound System
 "New York Town" by Black 47 on the album New York Town (2004)
 Voice of Hope by Tommy Fleming
 Absolutely Irish, a multi-artist session recording (2008)
 Into the Deep: America, Whaling & The World by Brian Keane (2010)
 An Irish Christmas by Keith and Kristyn Getty (2011)
 Copper: Original Soundtrack by Brian Keane (2013)

References

External links 
 

1965 births
American people of Irish descent
Iona University alumni
Irish fiddlers
Living people
People from the Bronx
21st-century American violinists
21st-century American women musicians
Green Linnet Records artists